Mongolia participated in the 9th Asian Games, officially known as the XI Asiad held in Delhi, India from 12 November to 4 December 1982. Mongolia ranked 9th in overall medal table with 3 gold medals in this Asiad edition.

Medal summary

Medals by sport

Medalists

Boxing

Shooting

Wrestling

References

Nations at the 1982 Asian Games
1982
Asian Games